Destan Bajselmani (born 8 February 1999) is a professional footballer who plays as a right-back for Dutch club PEC Zwolle. Born in the Netherlands, he represents Kosovo at international level.

Club career

PEC Zwolle
On 5 October 2019, Bajselmani made his debut as a professional footballer in a 1–0 away defeat against Heerenveen after coming on as a substitute at 33rd minute in place of injured Gustavo Hamer. On 16 June 2020, he signed his first professional contract with Eredivisie side PEC Zwolle after agreeing to a two-year deal.

International career

Under-21
On 6 November 2020, Bajselmani received a call-up from Kosovo U21 for a 2021 UEFA European Under-21 Championship qualification matches against Albania U21 and Turkey U21, but due to injury, could not be part of the national team.

Senior
On 25 May 2021, Bajselmani received a call-up from Kosovo for the friendly matches against San Marino, Malta, Guinea and Gambia. Seven days later, he made his debut with Kosovo in a friendly match against San Marino after being named in the starting line-up.

Personal life
Bajselmani was born in Enschede, Netherlands to Kosovo Albanian parents from Suva Reka and Skenderaj.

References

External links

1999 births
Living people
Footballers from Enschede
Kosovan footballers
Kosovo international footballers
Dutch footballers
Dutch people of Kosovan descent
Dutch people of Albanian descent
Association football fullbacks
Eredivisie players
PEC Zwolle players